Gerra radicalis is a species of moth in the family Noctuidae (the owlet moths). It is found in North America.

The MONA or Hodges number for Gerra radicalis is 9302.

References

Further reading

 
 
 

Agaristinae
Articles created by Qbugbot
Moths described in 1865